Vicalvi (locally Ucalue) is a comune (municipality) in the Province of Frosinone in the Italian region Lazio, located in the Valle di Comino about  east of Rome and about  east of Frosinone.

Vicalvi borders the following municipalities: Alvito, Casalvieri, Fontechiari, Posta Fibreno.

Sights include the Lombard Castle, built in the 11th century. There are also remains of Cyclopean walls built by the Samnites in ancient times.

References

Cities and towns in Lazio